APSL can refer to:

Apple Public Source License
American Premier Soccer League
American Professional Soccer League
Above Present Sea Level